Walkerburn railway station served the village of Walkerburn, Scottish Borders, Scotland from 1867 to 1962 on the Peebles Railway.

History 
The station opened on 15 January 1867 by the Peebles Railway. It was situated on the west side of an unnamed minor road running on from Cabberston Road. The station was not ready when the line to Galashiels was extended on 18 June 1966; it opened 6 months later. The yard consisted of two sidings, both of which were loops giving access from both directions. The siding closer to the main line passed through a stone-built goods shed with a canopy on one side to protect goods vehicles while they were unloading. The station closed to passengers and goods traffic on 5 February 1962.

References

External links 

Disused railway stations in the Scottish Borders
Former North British Railway stations
Railway stations in Great Britain opened in 1867
Railway stations in Great Britain closed in 1962
1867 establishments in Scotland
1962 disestablishments in Scotland